Porto da Barra Beach is located in Barra neighborhood in the city of Salvador, Brazil. The southern range of the beach is on a slope just above of the Barra Lighthouse at Santo Antônio da Barra Fort; the northern range of the beach is at São Diogo Fort. The Santa Maria Fort extends from a point near the southern end of the beach. The beach, unlike the bay, has calm water. It is one of the few west-facing beaches in Brazil and attracts numerous residents and tourists to watch the sunset.

Porto da Barra was the site of Bahia's first European settlement, Vila Velha, or the Old Village. The Marco da Fundação da Cidade do Salvador, a marble column and panel of azulejo tiles, was placed at the north of the beach to commemorate the 400th anniversary of the arrival of the Portuguese in Bahia.

The beach was a popular hangout for the Tropicalistas in the 1960s, notably Caetano Veloso and Gilberto Gil. Veloso's song Qual é Baiana? is inspired by the beach.

The Porto da Barra Beach suffers from marine pollution due to the underdeveloped sewage system of Salvador and inadequate garbage collection.

See also 
LGBT tourism in Brazil

References

Geography of Salvador, Bahia
Landforms of Bahia
Beaches of Brazil
Tourist attractions in Salvador, Bahia
LGBT in Brazil
LGBT tourism